Meet Me in the Bathroom is a 2022 documentary film. It is based upon the book Meet me in the Bathroom.

References

External links
 

2022 documentary films
British rock music films